Noah Zachary Jones (born June 20, 1973) is an American animator, writer, illustrator and producer.  He is the creator of the television series Fish Hooks, Almost Naked Animals, The 7D, and Pickle and Peanut. Jones was born in Fairport, New York, graduated from Fairport High School in 1991 and from Pacific Northwest College of Art in 1996. He lives in Los Angeles, California.

Life and career
Noah Z. Jones was born on June 20, 1973. After graduating from Fairport High School in 1991, Jones attended Pacific Northwest College of Art and majored in Illustration. While attending college, he began to write children's books. Jones illustrated the children's book Not Norman: A Goldish Story (2005) and its sequel Norman: One Amazing Goldfish! (2020). In 2006, Jones was in Camden, Maine working on children's books and freelance illustrating when Disney Channel asked him if he was interested in creating a television show. Jones pitched several ideas and Disney chose to move forward with what would eventually become Fish Hooks. He worked on the series remotely for two years before moving to California to work with the Disney team face-to-face. Fish Hooks went on the air in 2010. Jones chose to use photo collages for the background and digital drawings for the characters to give the show a quirky and hand-made feeling. He stated that simple shapes were chosen for the fish characters so they emotions and facial features would be emphasized. The show ran for three seasons.

In June 2014, it was announced that Disney would pick up Jones' new series, Pickle and Peanut. Disney had asked Jones to create another series after the success of Fish Hooks and paired him with Joel Trussell. Jones stated that he wanted the main characters to act like normal teenage boys and incorporate offbeat humor. The series debuted on Disney XD in the fall of 2015. Jones also wrote and sung the show's theme song.

Works

Book illustrations
Always in Trouble
 Trouble
Welcome to the Bed & Biscuit
Those Shoes
The Monster in the Backpack
 The Superheroes Employment Agency
 Princess Pink and the Land of Fake-believe
 Little Sweet Potato
 Duck, Duck, Moose!
 The Monster in the Backpack
Welcome to the Bed & Biscuit
Dance with Me (book)|Dance with Me
Not Norman: A Goldfish Story

Television

Personal life 
Jones is married and has a son and a daughter.

References

External links

Living people
American animators
American illustrators
American male screenwriters
1973 births
People from Fairport, New York
Pacific Northwest College of Art alumni
Artists from New York (state)
Screenwriters from New York (state)
Disney Television Animation people